Alex Arrowsmith (born July 10, 1982) is a rock/pop musician from Portland, Oregon. He is best known for his work with The Minders and The Shaky Hands, as well as his solo catalog.

Discography

Studio albums

Compilations

References

External links
 Official Site
 [ Allmusic]
 

1982 births
Living people
American male singer-songwriters
American rock singers
American rock songwriters
Singer-songwriters from Oregon
People from Hood River, Oregon
21st-century American male singers
21st-century American singers
The Minders members